The archaeological site of Grand contains a wide amphitheater and a mosaic of 232m². It is located in the French department of Vosges, in the region Grand Est, in France.
It was an ancient Gallo-Roman city named Andésina (15.000-20.000 inhabitants) and now it's a little village called Grand.

The amphitheater was built at the end of the 1st century and can contain 17.000 people.

The mosaic shows at the center a theater scene of the Phasma of Menander and at the four corners, four animals.

References 

 
 
 
 

Roman towns and cities
Archaeological sites in France